The International Microwave Power Institute (IMPI) is an organization devoted to microwave energy and its usage. The organization has conducted surveys  as well as educated the public to dispel microwave myths

Founded in Canada in 1966, it is now headquartered in Mechanicsville, Virginia. It was initially created for industrial and scientific purposes, however in 1977, IMPI's purpose was expanded to deal with the evolution of microwave oven for the home.

The professional scientific journal of IMPI is the Journal of Microwave Power and Electromagnetic Energy.

References

Official website

Engineering societies
American engineering organizations
Professional associations based in the United States
Organizations based in Virginia
Organizations established in 1966
1966 establishments in Canada
Microwave technology